The first season of Nikita, an American television drama based on the French film La Femme Nikita (1990), the remake Point of No Return (1993), and a previous series La Femme Nikita (1997). It aired from September 9, 2010, until May 12, 2011, with a total of 22 episodes. The season finale received a 63rd Primetime Emmy Awards nomination for "Outstanding Sound Editing for a Series".

Cast

Main cast
Maggie Q as Nikita Mears
Shane West as Michael Bishop
Lyndsy Fonseca as Alexandra "Alex" Udinov
Aaron Stanford as Seymour Birkhoff
Ashton Holmes as Thom
Tiffany Hines as Jaden
Melinda Clarke as Helen "Amanda" Collins
Xander Berkeley as Percival "Percy" Rose

Recurring cast
Rob Stewart as Roan
Noah Bean as Ryan Fletcher
Devon Sawa as Owen Elliott

Episodes

Production and release
During February and March 2010, Maggie Q, Shane West, Lyndsy Fonseca, Xander Berkeley, Tiffany Hines, Melinda Clarke, Aaron Stanford and Ashton Holmes were all cast to star in Nikita. Devon Sawa was cast in a recurring role as Owen Elliot. Former president and chairman of Marvel Comics Stan Lee made a cameo appearance in the episode "The Guardian" after he and lead actress Q met at the 2011 San Diego Comic-Con International. In October 2010, Noah Bean gained a recurring role as Ryan Fletcher.

While presenting its 2010–11 season schedule on May 21, 2010, The CW officially confirmed the pick-up of the series and announced its intention to air Nikita after The Vampire Diaries on Thursday nights. The pilot episode premiered on September 9, 2010, which drew 3.6 million viewers on its initial broadcast. This rating became The CW's best rating of all-time on Thursdays among women. 

In October, 2010, the show was picked up for a full season, which would total 22 episodes. 
The CW have admitted they took gambles this year but said they were "thrilled that [it] paid off for us." The season finale aired on May 12, 2011, and was seen by 1.95 million viewers. The first season averaged 2.90 million viewers and a 1.1 18–49 rating per episode, ranking 210th in the television season.

Plot
The first season begins with Alex being brought to Division from Death row after a deliberately botched robbery attempt. While inside Division, Alex forges a friendship with Thom, a recruit who has nearly achieved agent-status. Jaden, another recruit, immediately becomes antagonistic towards Alex. Alex also meets Percy, Division's leader, and Michael, Nikita's former mentor and romantic interest, who trains the recruits.

Alex repeatedly passes Nikita information about Division's operations and assassination attempts, allowing Nikita the opportunity to intercept them. Not every mission goes as planned, however, and Nikita has frequent run-ins with her former mentor, Michael. Michael has been told by Percy to kill Nikita on sight, although he frequently shows mild affection towards her by letting her go.

Division quickly catches on that there is a mole in their organization, and begins searching for him/her. In the meantime they find out that Birkhoff, the computers expert, has a transmitter planted in his tooth, presumably put there by Nikita. For her graduation test from Division, Alex is tasked with killing the leader of a crime syndicate, but her mission goes wrong. To save Alex from being "cleaned" by Division (their term for eliminating agents), Nikita allows Alex to bring her to Division as her "captive," although they plan to escape together afterwards. While Nikita is interrogated by Amanda, Alex sets off explosives to distract everyone. Nikita is able to escape. During the chaos, Thom realizes Alex is the mole. They fight, and Alex accidentally shoots Thom. Grieving, she stays with him instead of escaping with Nikita, and places evidence on his body to make him look like the mole. Later, she is promoted to Field Agent. 

Now able to live in the outside world, Alex meets her next door neighbor named Nathan, who she forms a relationship with. Nikita works with Ryan Fletcher, a CIA analyst who agrees to help Nikita after she saves his life, and Owen Elliot, a former Division agent who killed Nikita's fiancé, to try to find Division's black boxes, which keep a record of all of their former operations. The boxes are protected by Guardians, special agents designated to protect each box. Owen has a black box, which Nikita destroys. She believes destroying the boxes will remove any insurance Division may have. She also faces a new enemy in the form of GOGOL, a Russian criminal organisation and spin-off from Division, led by Ari Tasarov, which is trying to take over from Division. 

Michael begins to suspect Alex, and after a thorough search, finds Nikita's hideout. Nikita helps Michael to find Kasim Tariq, the man who murdered his wife and daughter. Discovering that Tariq was a former Division agent and was told by Percy to kill his family, Michael turns against Division and begins to work with Nikita. They also begin a relationship. With Michael's help, Nikita is able to find and destroy the second black box.

Nikita makes plans for Alex to escape Division because her cover has become compromised, but Alex saves Jaden's life during a mission, changing the plan. After the mission, Jaden secretly gives a supposedly-destroyed nerve toxin to Percy, who then promotes her to Agent status. 

Alex tells Nathan who she is and tries to get him to run away with her, but Jaden finds out. When she attempts to call in Alex's betrayal, she and Alex fight, and Nathan ends up shooting Jaden. Amanda finds out through Jaden's cochlear implant that Alex is the mole. Percy uses this information to draw Nikita into a trap, by telling Alex that it was Nikita who killed her parents. He also plans to take over the CIA by having its Director, Malcolm, a CIA cryptographer, and Fletcher to be killed when they hack into the next black box. However, Alex saves Nikita by using a toxin to feign her death, and Nikita manages to save the CIA members from Percy's plan. Amanda pretends to let Alex go so she can pursue a new life, warning her to stay away from Nikita. After Alex disobeys Amanda's order, she is recaptured on the orders of Oversight (the group of high officials who sanction Division). Oversight and Amanda recruit Alex to stop Nikita from releasing the black box. In return, Alex will receive information about who killed her father.

Accolades
The first season of Nikita received a total of seven awards nominations. In 2010, the episode "Pilot" received a nomination in the category "Best Cinematography in Episodic TV Series" in the American Society of Cinematographers. The following year, the series received a nomination for "Favorite TV Drama" in the 37th People's Choice Awards and nominations for Maggie Q and Lyndsy Fonseca performances in the 2011 Teen Choice Awards.  Shane West was awarded "Choice TV Actor Action" in the ceremony. The season finale received a Primetime Emmy Awards nomination for Outstanding Sound Editing for a Series, which result is still pending.

Media release
The first season of Nikita, distributed by Warner Bros. on DVD and Blu-ray, features all the 22 episodes. It also includes deleted scenes, "Inside Division, Part 1: The New Nikita", "Inside Division, Part 2: Executing an Episode", "Profiling Nikita, Alex, Percy & Michael", audio commentaries and a gag reel as bonus features. The box-set was released on August 30, 2011, in North America, and was released on September 19, 2011, in Europe and October 26, 2011, in Australia.

In Japan, Itano Tomomi, pop singer and member of the girl group AKB48, was chosen as the image girl for the DVD release of Nikita by appearing in commercials to promote the product.

References

External links
 
 

2010 American television seasons
2011 American television seasons
Season 1